John F. Roach  (November 19, 1867 – April 2, 1934) was a 19th-century Major League Baseball player. In 1887 he pitched in a single game for the New York Giants. He also had an extensive minor league baseball career, that lasted from 1886 through 1898.

References

Major League Baseball pitchers
New York Giants (NL) players
Baseball players from Pennsylvania
Sportspeople from Peoria, Illinois
1867 births
1934 deaths
Long Island A's players
Waterbury Brassmen players
Wilkes-Barre Coal Barons players
Lowell Magicians players
Wilkes-Barre Barons (baseball) players
Elmira Hottentots players
Galveston Sand Crabs players
Lincoln Rustlers players
Des Moines Prohibitionists players
Kansas City Blues (baseball) players
Los Angeles Seraphs players
Los Angeles Angels (minor league) players
Peoria Distillers players
Detroit Tigers (Western League) players
Quincy Browns players
Quincy Ravens players
Houston Buffaloes players
Buffalo Bisons (minor league) players
Galveston Sandcrabs players
Peoria Blackbirds players
19th-century baseball players